Andri Muliadi (born 26 February 1993) is an Indonesian professional footballer who plays as a centre-back for Liga 2 club PSMS Medan.

Honours

Club 
Persebaya Surabaya
 Liga 2: 2017
 Liga 1 runner-up: 2019
 Indonesia President's Cup runner-up: 2019

References

External links
 Andri Muliadi at Soccerway
 Andri Muliadi at Liga Indonesia

1993 births
Living people
Indonesian footballers
People from Banda Aceh
Sportspeople from Aceh
Persiraja Banda Aceh players
Persebaya Surabaya players
Borneo F.C. players
Persela Lamongan players
PSMS Medan players
Liga 2 (Indonesia) players
Liga 1 (Indonesia) players
Association football defenders